Revolutionary Islam (French L'islam révolutionnaire) is a book written by international revolutionary Ilich Ramírez Sánchez, also known as Carlos the Jackal, under the direction of Jean-Michel Vernochet. It was published in 2003 by the Éditions du Rocher.

External links 
 L'islam révolutionnaire (French), Internet Archive
 'Jackal' book praises Bin Laden, BBC

2003 non-fiction books
Books about Islamism
Books about revolutions